Seoci, which translates as Villages from Serbo-Croatian,  can refer to one of the following settlements:

In Bosnia and Herzegovina

 Seoci (Gornji Vakuf)
 Seoci (Jajce)
 Seoci (Vareš)

In Croatia

 Seoci, Croatia